The Dominican Humanist Party is a minor humanist political party of the Dominican Republic, without parliamentary representation after the 16 May 2006 election. In 2020, it received 0.84% of the vote in all elections that year.  Its presidential candidate was Luis Abinader The president of the Party, elected in 2021, is Ramón Emilio Goris.

References

Political parties in the Dominican Republic
Dominican Republic